Ormond; Or, The Secret Witness is a 1799 political  and social novel by American writer Charles Brockden Brown. The novel thematically focuses on the ways in which individuals change in reaction to their social environments. The novel follows a female protagonist Constantia and her relationship with the mysterious Ormond, who is also the title character. The novel thoroughly explores the republicanism and republican values common to the early American nation. The novel was originally published in three volumes.

References

Further reading

External links

Project Gutenberg

1799 novels
American gothic novels
18th-century American novels
Novels by Charles Brockden Brown